Jeotgalibacillus soli is a Gram-positive, rod-shaped, spore-forming and motile bacterium from the genus of Jeotgalibacillus which has been isolated from soil from Sines in Portugal.

References 

Bacillales
Bacteria described in 2011